Josef Weikl (born 15 January 1954) is a retired German footballer, who played as a midfielder. He made 303 appearances in the Bundesliga, all of them for Fortuna Düsseldorf. He won the DFB-Pokal in 1979 and 1980 with the club.

References

External links 
 
 Josef Weikl at DFB

1954 births
Living people
German footballers
Association football midfielders
Bundesliga players
2. Bundesliga players
Fortuna Düsseldorf players
People from Regen (district)
Sportspeople from Lower Bavaria
Footballers from Bavaria
West German footballers